Taylor County is a county located in the U.S. state of Iowa. As of the 2020 census, the population was 5,896, making it the fourth-least populous county in Iowa. The county seat is Bedford. The county was formed in 1847 and named after General and President Zachary Taylor.

Geography

A portion of Taylor County at one time was part of Missouri.

Major highways
 Iowa Highway 2
 Iowa Highway 25
 Iowa Highway 148

Adjacent counties
Adams County  (north)
Ringgold County  (east)
Worth County, Missouri  (southeast)
Nodaway County, Missouri  (southwest)
Page County  (west)

Demographics

2020 census
There were 2,885 housing units, of which 2,506 were occupied.

2010 census
There were 3,107 housing units, of which 2,679 were occupied.

2000 census

At the 2000 census there were 6,958 people, 2,824 households, and 1,911 families in the county.  The population density was 13 people per square mile (5/km2).  There were 3,199 housing units at an average density of 6 per square mile (2/km2).  The racial makeup of the county was 97.71% White, 0.03% Black or African American, 0.10% Native American, 0.30% Asian, 0.06% Pacific Islander, 1.14% from other races, and 0.66% from two or more races.  3.81%. were Hispanic or Latino of any race.

Of the 2,824 households 28.00% had children under the age of 18 living with them, 59.00% were married couples living together, 5.90% had a female householder with no husband present, and 32.30% were non-families. 27.80% of households were one person and 16.10% were one person aged 65 or older.  The average household size was 2.40 and the average family size was 2.94.

The age distribution was 23.90% under the age of 18, 7.50% from 18 to 24, 23.40% from 25 to 44, 22.80% from 45 to 64, and 22.40% 65 or older.  The median age was 42 years. For every 100 females there were 94.10 males.  For every 100 females age 18 and over, there were 92.00 males.

The median household income was $31,297 and the median family income  was $37,194. Males had a median income of $26,631 versus $19,162 for females. The per capita income for the county was $15,082.  About 8.50% of families and 12.10% of the population were below the poverty line, including 13.10% of those under age 18 and 15.20% of those age 65 or over.

Communities

Cities

Bedford
Blockton
Clearfield (partially)
Conway
Gravity
Lenox (partially)
New Market
Sharpsburg

Census-designated place
Athelstan

Townships

Bedford
Benton
Clayton
Dallas
Gay
Grant
Grove
Holt
Jackson
Jefferson
Marshall
Mason
Nodaway
Platte
Polk
Ross
Washington

Population ranking
The population ranking of the following table is based on the 2020 census of Taylor County.

† county seat

Politics

See also

National Register of Historic Places listings in Taylor County, Iowa

References

External links

Taylor County

 
1847 establishments in Iowa
Populated places established in 1847